Boccanera is a surname. Notable people with the surname include:

Fabio Boccanera (born 1964), Italian voice actor, brother of Laura
Giacinto Boccanera (1666–1746), Italian painter
Laura Boccanera (born 1961), Italian voice actress

See also
Boccanegra